Patricia Ameyalli Gutiérrez Velazco (born 26 October 1995) is a Mexican professional football midfielder who currently plays for Tijuana of the Liga MX Femenil.

References

External links 
 

1995 births
Living people
Mexican women's footballers
Footballers from Baja California
Mexican footballers
Sportspeople from Tijuana
Liga MX Femenil players
Club Tijuana (women) footballers
Women's association football midfielders